Spain a surname English, Norman, French, Irish in origin, but linked to expatriates, or colonialists, who either had origins in Spain or had spent a significant amount of time there. The evolution of the name came about when the government of each European country introduced personal taxation, known as Poll Tax in England, and surnames became necessary for record keeping.

Earliest usage 
The earliest recorded use of the surname;
in the form of de Espaigne is from 1179 in the Pipe Rolls of Essex during the reign of King Henry II 
in the form of Espáine...
in the form of Spane is from 1302 in Subsidy Rolls of Yorkshire
in the form of Spaigne is from 1318 in the Calendar of Letter Books of London
in the form of Spayne is from 1327 in the Subsidy Rolls of Cambridgeshire
in the form of de Hispania is from 1086 in the Domesday Book of 1086, came from Espaignes
in the form of Spaine is from 1579 in the Recordings from London Church Registers
in the form of Spain is from 1697 in the Recordings from London Church Registers

People

Míl Espáine
Amy Spain (c. 1848 – 1865), American slave
Douglas Spain (born 1974), American film and television actor
Frances Lander Spain
Francis Spain
Frank K. Spain
James W. Spain (1926–2008), American Foreign Service
Karl Spain
Ken Spain
Mark Spain
Nancy Spain
Patrick Spain
Quinton Spain
Robert Spain (politician), Vermont legislator
Robert Hitchcock Spain (1925–2022), American Methodist bishop
W.J. Spain

See also
Moors
Spanish Armada
Black Irish
Black Scottish

Notes

English-language surnames
Surnames of English origin